Qaleh Now (also Romanized as Qal`eh Now and Qal‘eh-ye Now; also known as Mazār) is a village in Vakilabad Rural District, in the Central District of Arzuiyeh County, Kerman Province, Iran. At the 2006 census, its population was 833, in 192 families.

References 

Populated places in Arzuiyeh County